Jarugumalai is a small hill station in south side of Salem District of Tamil Nadu State. Two tribal villages Melur and Keelur, situated about 3,000 feet above the sea level in the hills. over 1,200 people live in this two villages in Jarugumalai in Kuralnatham panchayat.  District administration has opened a primary school for the benefit of the students in the village. Though electricity, drinking water and primary education facility are available, Melur and Keelur villages lack medical facilities, public distribution outlet and road facilities. Electricity reached at Jarugumalai after 60 years from India independence. Jarugumalai Pin code is 636201.

References

About Jarugumalai
Government GO

Villages in Salem district